The 1976 Swedish Open was a men's tennis tournament played on outdoor clay courts held in Båstad, Sweden. It was a Three Star category tournament and part of the Grand Prix circuit. It was the 29th edition of the tournament and was held from 4 July through 11 July 1976. Unseeded Tonino Zugarelli won the singles title.

Finals

Singles
 Tonino Zugarelli defeated  Corrado Barazzutti 4–6, 7–5, 6–2

Doubles
 Fred McNair /  Sherwood Stewart defeated  Wojciech Fibak /  Juan Gisbert 6–3, 6–4

References

External links
 ITF tournament edition details

Swedish Open
Swedish Open
Swedish Open
July 1976 sports events in Europe